Karen Elizabeth Walker  (born December 1969) is a noted New Zealand fashion designer.

Private life
Walker was born in December 1969. She grew up in the Auckland suburb of Remuera and attended Epsom Girls' Grammar School. Aged 21, she married Mikhail Gherman.

Career 
Walker began her fashion label in 1987, and opened her first store in Newmarket, Auckland, in 1995. She began selling to Barneys New York in 1998, the same year she showed her first runway collection. In late 2011, she signed a partnership with United States-based retail chain Anthropologie.

She has designed clothes worn by Björk, Sienna Miller, Natalie Portman, M.I.A., Alexa Chung, Beth Ditto, Michael Haneke, Liv Tyler, Rihanna, Claire Danes, Zooey Deschanel and Jennifer Lopez. She designed clothes worn by Kate Winslet in the Michel Gondry film Eternal Sunshine of the Spotless Mind.

In the 2004 New Year Honours, Walker was appointed a Member of the New Zealand Order of Merit, for services to the fashion industry. She was promoted to Companion of the New Zealand Order of Merit, for services to fashion design, in the 2014 New Year Honours. In 2009 Walker received a World Class New Zealand Award  in the Creative category.

Walker is also an expert on colour for interiors and has partnered with Resene to produce her own line of paint colours.

References

External links
Official Website
NZ Fashion Profile
Karen Walker interview regarding her style

New Zealand fashion designers
New Zealand women fashion designers
Living people
Companions of the New Zealand Order of Merit
People educated at Epsom Girls' Grammar School
1969 births
People from Auckland